Lientur Rocks is a group of prominent adjacent rocks lying off the north coast of Robert Island in the South Shetland Islands, Antarctica and extending  in east–west direction and  in north–south direction.  The area was visited by early 19th-century sealers operating from nearby Clothier Harbour.

The feature was named by the 1949-50 Chilean Antarctic Expedition after the expedition patrol ship Lientur.

Location

See also 
 Composite Antarctic Gazetteer
 List of Antarctic islands south of 60° S
 SCAR
 Territorial claims in Antarctica

Maps
 L.L. Ivanov. Antarctica: Livingston Island and Greenwich, Robert, Snow and Smith Islands. Scale 1:120000 topographic map.  Troyan: Manfred Wörner Foundation, 2009.

References

External links
Composite Antarctic Gazetteer.

Rock formations of Robert Island
Islands of the South Shetland Islands